The transterpreter is computer software, an interpreter for the transputer, is a virtual machine for the programming language occam-π (occam-pi), and a portable runtime for the KRoC compiler. It is designed for education and research in concurrency and robotics. The transterpreter was developed at the University of Kent.

The transterpeter has made it possible to easily run occam-π programs on platforms such as the Lego Mindstorms RCX, Arduino, IA-32, SPARC, MIPS, and the Cell BE, on the operating systems Linux, macOS, Microsoft Windows, and MS-DOS.

See also 
 KRoC

References 

Virtual machines
University of Kent
Programming language implementation
Concurrent programming languages